To Make a Killing (also known as Vicious and Wild Boys) is a 1988 Australian drama thriller film written and directed by Karl Zwicky and co-written by P. J. Hogan. It stars Tamblyn Lord, Craig Pearce, Tiffiny Dowe and Kelly Dingwall.

Plot
Damon (Tamblyn Lord) graduates from high school but ends up bored on summer vacation and looks to rebel. He meets a trio of home invaders led by Terry (Craig Pearce) whose lifestyle offers Damon the excitement he craves, until the gang's crimes escalate during a home invasion, which results in murder. Damon must now decide how far he's willing to go to survive.

Cast
Tamblyn Lord as Damon Kennedy
Craig Pearce as Terry
Tiffiny Dowe as Sondra Price
Kelly Dingwall as Benny
John Godden as Felix
Joanna Lockwood as Diane Kennedy
Gerard Maguire as Brian Kennedy
Ajay Rochester as Claire 
John Clayton as Graham Price
Louise Cullen as Adele Price

Production
Producers Tom Broadbridge and David Hannay had decided to make a package of four exploitation films all shot on 35mm for the world video market which were all shot in late 1987. This was one of them - Broadbridge wanted Zwicky to make another script but he wanted to make his own and the producers agreed. The script was written in five weeks and the movie was shot in four 6-day weeks in the northern suburbs of Sydney.

Release
The film was not released theatrically and went straight to video.

See also
List of films featuring home invasions

References

External links

Vicious at Oz Movies

Australian thriller drama films
1988 films
Films directed by Karl Zwicky
1980s English-language films
1980s Australian films